Víctor Laplace (born 30 May 1943) is an Argentine film actor.

Laplace was born in Tandil, Buenos Aires. The son of a watchmaking jeweler and a housewife. When he was 14, he started working as a metallurgist in a factory, there he also recited Shakespeare poems. When he was 18, he left the family for Buenos Aires and the theatre.

He has appeared in over 80 films since 1970, including Eva Perón: The True Story (1996, in which he portrayed President Juan Perón) and Un Amor en Moisés Ville in 2001, as well as extensive local and international theatre credits. He has also directed six films.

In 1971, he had a relationship with Renata Schussheim, which produced his son, Damián.

He later became the partner of Nelida Lobato a dancer and actress, who accompanied him into exile when he left Buenos Aires, after being threatened by the Triple A.

Filmography
Puerta de Hierro
Los Exitosos Perez (2009)- Alfonso Duarte
Detrás del sol, más cielo (2007) - Antón
Angelelli, la palabra viva (2007)
Costo argentino (2004) (episodio "Estado de sitio")
La mina (2003) - Don Sebastián
Mate Cosido, el bandolero fantasma (2003)
I love you... Torito (2001) - Voz en off
El fuego y el soñador (inédita - 2001) - Esposo de Nora
Casi ángeles (2000) - Dr. Tossi (episodio "Perdidos")
El amor y el espanto (2000) - Carlos Daneri
Un amor en Moisés Ville (2000) - David adulto
El mar de Lucas (1999) - Juan Denevi
Cerca de la frontera (1999)
Peligro nuclear (inédita - 1999)
Pozo de zorro (1998)
Doña Bárbara (1998)
Secretos compartidos (1998) - Vicente Duarte
Sin reserva (1997)
Comodines (1997) - Julio Lizarraga
Eva Perón (1996) - Juan Domingo Perón
Lola Mora (1995)
Historias de amor, de locura y de muerte (1994)
Convivencia (1994)
El camino de los sueños (1993)
La garganta del diablo (inédita - 1993)
Flop (1990) - Florencio Parravicini
La amiga (1989) - Diego
Nunca estuve en Viena (1989) - Don Francisco
Después del último tren (inédita - 1989)
Letters from the Park (1988)
Mamá querida (1988)
Extrañas salvajes (1988)
Chorros (1987) - Pablo Ferrán
Sentimientos (1987)
Debajo del mundo (1987)
Los dueños del silencio (1987) - Padre Raimundo
Los amores de Laurita (1986)
Chechechela, una chica de barrio (1986)
Expreso à la emboscada (1986) - Padre Cesáreo
Pobre mariposa (1986)
Te amo (1986) - Padre de Valeria
Sin querer, queriendo (1985) - Pédro Ávila
El rigor del destino (1985)
Flores robadas en los jardines de Quilmes (1985)
Los días de junio (1985) - Abaurréa
El caso Matías (1985)
Adiós, Roberto (1985)
Gracias por el fuego (1983)
No habrá más penas ni olvido (1983) - Reinaldo
Se acabó el curro (1983)
Espérame mucho (1983)
El poder de la censura (1983)
Una mujer (1975)
La guerra del cerdo (1975)
Los gauchos judíos (1974)
La malavida (1973) - Julio, el oriental
Vení conmigo (1972)
Operación Masacre (1972) - Carlos Lizaso
La Sartén por el mango (1972)
Disputas en la cama (1972)
Pájaro loco (1971)
Argentino hasta la muerte (1971)
Muerte dudosa

References

External links
 

Argentine male film actors
People from Tandil
1943 births
Living people
20th-century Argentine male actors
21st-century Argentine male actors